Anthony Philip O'Connor (born 24 June 1980) is an English cricketer.  O'Connor is a left-handed batsman who bowls left-arm medium pace.  He was born in Bradford, Yorkshire.

O'Connor made his debut for Shropshire in the 1991 Minor Counties Championship against Cheshire.  O'Connor has played Minor counties cricket for Shropshire from 1999 to present, which has included 36 Minor Counties Championship appearances and 19 MCCA Knockout Trophy appearances.  He made his List A debut against Devon in the 2001 Cheltenham & Gloucester Trophy.  He made 5 further List A appearances, the last of which came against Hampshire in the 2005 Cheltenham & Gloucester Trophy.  In his 6 List A matches, he took 5 wickets at an average of 39.20, with best figures of 2/27.

References

External links
Anthony O'Connor at ESPNcricinfo

1980 births
Living people
Cricketers from Bradford
English cricketers
Shropshire cricketers
English cricketers of 1969 to 2000
English cricketers of the 21st century